Lee Ji-hye (born 21 October 1982) is a South Korean taekwondo practitioner. 

She won a gold medal in flyweight at the 2003 World Taekwondo Championships in Garmisch-Partenkirchen. She won a silver medal at the 2004  Asian Taekwondo Championships.

References

External links

1982 births
Living people
South Korean female taekwondo practitioners
World Taekwondo Championships medalists
Asian Taekwondo Championships medalists
21st-century South Korean women